Tristan Lamasine and Albano Olivetti were the defending champions but only Olivetti chose to defend his title, partnering Kevin Krawietz. Olivetti lost in the first round to Ken and Neal Skupski.

Mikhail Elgin and Igor Zelenay won the title after defeating Skupski and Skupski 2–6, 7–5, [10–5] in the final.

Seeds

Draw

References
 Main Draw

Open BNP Paribas Banque de Bretagne - Doubles
Open BNP Paribas Banque de Bretagne